Sverre Martin Torp (born 3 March 1992) is a Norwegian footballer who plays as a midfielder for Ull/Kisa.

Club career
Hailing from Larvik, Torp where playing for Larvik Turn's first team in the Third Division until he was signed by Sandefjord Fotball's youth squad ahead of the 2009-season. In May 2010, he was taken up into Sandefjords first team squad, and during the 2010-season Torp played 13 matches in Tippeligaen.

International career
In August 2010, Torp was called up to replace Krister Wemberg in Norway U-19's squad for the friendlies against Denmark U-19. Torp have one cap for Norway U-19.

Career statistics

References

1992 births
Living people
People from Larvik
Norwegian footballers
Larvik Turn players
Sandefjord Fotball players
Eliteserien players
Association football midfielders
Ullensaker/Kisa IL players
Sportspeople from Vestfold og Telemark